GG Carinae is a binary star system in the southern constellation of Carina, abbreviated GG Car. It is a variable star with a brightness that fluctuates around an apparent visual magnitude of 8.67, making it too faint to be visible to the naked eye. The distance to this system is approximately 8,000 light years based on parallax measurements.

This star was found to have a peculiar spectrum by W. P. Fleming in 1892, matching the profile of a P Cygni star with bright emission lines of hydrogen. This period was confirmed by D. Hoffleit in 1933. A near infrared excess was detected in 1973, indicating a circumstellar dust shell.

Analysis of the spectrum by C. A. Hernández and associates in 1981 suggested the star is surrounded by a thick, extended envelope that is concealing absorption lines formed in the stellar photosphere. They used measurements of radial velocity variations to estimate a period of 31.03 days. In 1984, E. Gosset and associates used photoelectric photometry to find a period of 31.020 days, but were convinced by the data that the orbital period is twice that value, or 62.039 days. GG Carinae was classified as a supergiant B[e] star  by Henny Lamers and associates in 1998, based on properties similar to B[e] supergiants in the Magellanic Clouds.

In 2004, M. A. Machado and associates used high resolution spectral measurements to confirm that this is a binary system with intrinsic variability. M. Kraus detected an enriched abundance of carbon-13 (in the form of 13CO) in the stellar wind, confirming that this is an evolved B[e] supergiant rather than a pre-main-sequence star. Kraus and associates in 2013 detected CO gas in a circumbinary ring, which was possibly placed there by the primary as a rapidly-spinning Be star.  Alternatively, it may have come via Roche lobe overflow from the secondary member of the system, about which little is known. Brightness variations related to the orbital period are thought to be due to mass transfer between the components during periastron.

GG Carinae is almost certainly a member of the rich but faint open cluster ASCC 63, which is thought to have about 1,700 member stars.

References

Further reading

B(e) stars
Binary stars
Circumstellar disks

Carina (constellation)
Durchmusterung objects
094878
053444
Carinae, GG